K.C.T. Engineering College is an Engineering College in Gulbarga District of Karnataka, India. It was established in 2001 under HSMAKCT (Hazrat Shaik Minhajuddin Ansari Kallerawan Charitable Trust) under the Guidance of Qamar ul Islam. It is approved by AICTE and recognised by V.T.U. Belgam.

Campus
The college is located in the Qamar Colony of Dargah Area on Ring Road, Gulbarga, Karnataka. It contains separate hostels for boys and girls, a library, a playground, a workshop, a com lab, a sports department and a classroom.

Streams
The college currently offers four programs

Computer Science and Engineering .
Mechanical Engineering.
Electronics and Communication Engineering.
Civil Engineering. 

Engineering colleges in Karnataka
Educational institutions established in 2001
Education in Kalaburagi
Universities and colleges in Kalaburagi district
Affiliates of Visvesvaraya Technological University
2001 establishments in Karnataka
Companies based in Kalaburagi